Carmine Esposito (born 30 September 1970 in Naples) is an Italian former professional footballer who played as a forward for Empoli, Fiorentina, Sampdoria and Vicenza, among other Italian clubs.

External links
 Career statistics by TuttoCalciatori.net

1970 births
Living people
Italian footballers
Serie A players
Serie B players
Serie C players
A.S. Sambenedettese players
Empoli F.C. players
ACF Fiorentina players
U.C. Sampdoria players
L.R. Vicenza players
U.S. Alessandria Calcio 1912 players
Imolese Calcio 1919 players
Forlì F.C. players
Association football forwards